Geir Berdahl (born 19 June 1945) is a Norwegian publisher, the leader of Forlaget Oktober for 35 years.

Career
In the 1970s Berdahl was associated with SUF (m-l) and the Workers' Communist Party AKP (m-l). He graduated as mag.art in literature from the University of Oslo in 1974. From 1974 to 1979 he was running the bookshop Tronsmo. He was chief executive officer of the publishing house Forlaget Oktober from 1979 to 2015.

From 2003 to 2006 he was chairman of the board of the newspaper Klassekampen, and he chaired the Norwegian Publishers' Association a period from 2005.

References

1945 births
Living people
University of Oslo alumni
Norwegian book publishers (people)